Skellytown is a town in Carson County, Texas, United States. Its population was 473 at the 2010 census, down from 610 at the 2000 census. Located in the Texas Panhandle, it is part of the Amarillo metropolitan area. In 1926, Skelly Oil Company purchased a  lease from Henry Schafer, a local rancher on whose land the Roxana oil pool was located. Schafer platted a new townsite, which he named "Skelly" in honor of the company's founder and president, William Grove Skelly of Tulsa, Oklahoma.

History
Skelly was sited between the oil boom camps of Roxana, which was north of Skelly,  and Noelette, which was east. The first businesses were company-owned supply stores. Residents had to gather wood for fuel and rely on trucked-in water supplies.

The Panhandle and Santa Fe Railway built a branch line north in 1927, from White Deer to the oilfields, and established its depot at a site just north of Skelly.  All three camps moved their businesses to the new site and formed the Skellytown Townsite Company. Four months later, Skellytown had two oil refineries, a carbon black -manufacturing plant, and about 100 oil wells operating in its vicinity. Also in 1927, a new post office opened, the Roxana-Skellytown News began publishing every week, Panhandle Power and Light began to provide utilities, and a four-room emergency hospital opened.

Geography

Skellytown is located in northeastern Carson County at  (35.572712, –101.172517), just northeast of Texas State Highway 152, which leads northwest  to Borger and southeast  to Pampa.

Climate

According to the Köppen climate classification, Skellytown has a semiarid climate, BSk on climate maps.

Demographics

As of the census of 2000,  610 people, 237 households, and 182 families were residing in the town. The population density was 1,416.5 people/sq mi (547.7/km2). The 283 housing units had an average density of 657.2/sq mi (254.1/km2). The racial makeup of the town was 93.93% White, 0.33% African American, 2.95% Native American, 0.16% Asian, 1.80% from other races, and 0.82% from two or more races. Hispanics or Latinos of any race were 4.75% of the population.

Of the 237 households,  35.9% had children under 18 living with them, 64.1% were married couples living together, 9.3% had a female householder with no husband present, and 23.2% were not families. About 21.1% of all households were made up of individuals, and 10.1% had someone living alone who was 65 or older. The average household size was 2.57, and the average family size was 2.99.

In the town, the age distribution was 26.6% under 18, 7.9% from 18 to 24, 22.5% from 25 to 44, 25.7% from 45 to 64, and 17.4% who were 65 or older. The median age was 42 years. For every 100 females, there were 94.3 males. For every 100 females age 18 and over, there were 91.5 males.

Males had a median income of $31,250 versus $18,750 for females. The per capita income for the town was $15,087. About 15.3% of families and 14.5% of the population were below the poverty line, including 18.1% of those under age 18 and 8.5% of those age 65 or over.

References

External links
Skellytown official website

Towns in Carson County, Texas
Towns in Texas
Towns in Amarillo metropolitan area
Populated places established in 1926